Magowan is a surname. Notable people with the surname include:

Alistair Magowan (born 1955), British Anglican bishop
David Magowan (born 1983), Northern Ireland footballer
John MaGowan (born 1941), Northern Ireland darts player
John Hall Magowan (died 1951), British diplomat
Kate Magowan (born 1975), English actress
Ken Magowan (born 1981), Canadian ice hockey player
Peter Magowan (1942–2019)
Peter Magowan (lawyer) (1762–1810), Canadian politician
Robert Magowan, Royal Marines Officer
Samuel Magowan (1910–1976), Northern Ireland politician

See also
McGowan